Sariosiyo (Persian: سرآسیا) is an urban-type settlement in Surxondaryo Region, Uzbekistan. It is the administrative center of Sariosiyo District. The town population in 1989 was 11,082 people.

References

Populated places in Surxondaryo Region
Urban-type settlements in Uzbekistan